Alice Frisca (March 7, 1900 — January 24, 1960) was the professional name of Alice Mayer, an American pianist.

Early life
Alice Mayer was from San Francisco, California, the daughter of Benjamin Mayer and Eva Mayer. Her stage name was a reference to that city. As a young woman she won the MacDowell Prize from the California Federation of Music Clubs. She was a student of Pierre Douillet, Clarence Eddy, and Leopold Godowsky.

Career
She made her Paris debut in 1920. Frisca was honored with a medal for a concert she gave in 1921 in Paris, a benefit for French and Belgian artists in need after World War I. "She has a conspicuously neat and fluent technique," noted critic Alfred Kalisch, writing in The Musical Times of her London debut in 1921, "and a touch of no little charm." Her New York debut a few months later drew similar critical appreciation, though the New-York Tribune scoffed that "Miss Frisca evidently mistakes force for brilliance," and said that she "more nearly resembled a noisy amateur than a professional pianist."

Personal life
Alice Frisca married businessman Ralph Kirsch in New York, and left behind her performing career. Her husband's nephew, Harold C. Schonberg, was the Pulitzer Prize-winning chief music critic at  The New York Times from 1960 to 1980; he cited her as his first piano teacher and an important early influence on his understanding of music. Alice Mayer Kirsch died in 1960, aged 59 years, while in Puerto Rico with her husband.

References

American classical pianists
American women classical pianists
1900 births
1960 deaths
20th-century American women pianists
20th-century classical pianists
20th-century American pianists